The 2022 Idemitsu FIM Asia Road Racing Championship was the 27th season of the Asia Road Racing Championship. The season started on 25 March at Chang International Circuit in Thailand and ended on 20 November back at Chang International Circuit.

Calendar and results

Calendar changes
 Prior to the start of the season, Round 3 was scheduled to be held between 1–3 July at a circuit that was to be announced later. However, it was announced on 28 May that the Round 4 stop at Sportsland Sugo scheduled for 12–14 August would act as the new Round 3.

 On 22 July, it was announced that the Round 4 stop at Zhuhai International Circuit was moved to Sepang International Circuit in Malaysia due to COVID-19 restrictions in China.

Teams and riders

All teams use series-specified Dunlop tyres.

Championship standings

Asia Superbike 1000

|valign="top"|

Bold – Pole positionItalics – Fastest lap† – Rider deceased
|}

Supersports 600

Bold – Pole positionItalics – Fastest lap

Asia Production 250

Bold – Pole positionItalics – Fastest lap

Underbone 150

Bold – Pole positionItalics – Fastest lap

TVS Asia One-Make Championship

Bold – Pole positionItalics – Fastest lap

References

External links
 

Asia Road Racing Championship
Asia Road Racing Championship seasons
Asia Road Racing Championship